Calbert Minott (born 1932) is a Jamaican cricketer. He played in one first-class match for the Jamaican cricket team in 1954/55.

See also
 List of Jamaican representative cricketers

References

External links
 

1932 births
Living people
Jamaican cricketers
Jamaica cricketers
People from Saint Thomas Parish, Jamaica